The Devil at His Elbow is a 1916 American silent drama film directed by Burton L. King and starring Clifford Bruce, Dorothy Green and Adolphe Menjou.

Cast
 Clifford Bruce as John Ashton 
 Dorothy Green as Meg 
 John K. Roberts as Robert Gray 
 Francis McDonald as Andrew Sealey 
 Mary Sandway as Grace Sealey 
 Adolphe Menjou as Wilfred Carleton 
 Edward Martindel as Franklin Darrow

References

Bibliography
 Alison McMahan. Alice Guy Blaché: Lost Visionary of the Cinema. Bloomsbury Publishing, 2014.

External links
 

1916 films
1916 drama films
1910s English-language films
American silent feature films
Silent American drama films
Films directed by Burton L. King
American black-and-white films
Metro Pictures films
1910s American films